Patrick Joseph Power (17 November 1850 – 8 January 1913) was an Irish Catholic landlord and MP. He was elected Home Rule MP for County Waterford in 1884. After division of the County Waterford constituency, he was MP for East Waterford from 1885 until his death in 1913.

Life
The son of Pierce Power (died 1887) and Eliza Hayden, Patrick Joseph Power was educated at Stonyhurst College. He owned 3,418 acres in Waterford and Tipperary, valued at £1000.

He died at his residence at 13 Templeton Place, London.

References

External links

1850 births
1913 deaths
UK MPs 1880–1885
UK MPs 1885–1886
UK MPs 1886–1892
UK MPs 1892–1895
UK MPs 1895–1900
UK MPs 1900–1906
UK MPs 1906–1910
UK MPs 1910
UK MPs 1910–1918
Members of the Parliament of the United Kingdom for County Waterford constituencies (1801–1922)
People educated at Stonyhurst College
19th-century Irish landowners
Anti-Parnellite MPs
Irish landlords
20th-century Irish landowners